Dawn French's Girls Who Do Comedy is an interview series shown on BBC Four, broadcast for one series in 2006. In the series, Dawn French interviewed some of the most prolific comedians of the century from Phyllis Diller to Catherine Tate and asked about life, love, family and comedy. The series was shown as three episodes featuring clips from French's various interviews with different comedians; however, from 25 to 30 December 2006 BBC Four showed six full interviews of 20–30 minutes . They are (in order of re-broadcast on BBC Four) Whoopi Goldberg, Catherine Tate, Kathy Burke, Julie Walters, Victoria Wood and Joan Rivers. This is one of the last interviews done with the late comedian Linda Smith. Each episode ends with a tribute to Linda Smith.

A spin-off series of six half-hour interviews, called Dawn French's More Girls Who Do Comedy, was transmitted on BBC Four.

It was followed in 2007 by Dawn French's More Boys Who Do Comedy and Dawn French's Boys Who Do Comedy.

Comedians featured

Catherine Tate
Julie Walters
Whoopi Goldberg
Victoria Wood
Kathy Burke
Joan Rivers
Jennifer Saunders
Linda Smith
Wanda Sykes
Kathy Najimy and Mo Gaffney
Helen Lederer
Denise Coffey
Phyllis Diller
Jessica Stevenson
Ruby Wax
Penny Marshall (only seen in one clip in Episode 1)
Eleanor Bron
Sarah Silverman
Morwenna Banks
Miriam Margolyes
Sheila Hancock
Miss Piggy
Gina Yashere
Rita Rudner
Mel Giedroyc and Sue Perkins
Margaret Cho
Tracey Ullman
Liza Tarbuck
Sandra Bernhard
Jenny Eclair
Laura Solon
Meera Syal
Jo Brand
Jessica Hynes
Jo Caulfield (Episodes 2–3)

References

External links

2006 British television series debuts
2006 British television series endings
BBC television comedy
BBC television talk shows